Bığır may refer to:
Bığır, Goychay, Azerbaijan
Bığır, Ismailli, Azerbaijan

See also 
 Bügür